
Alexander John Skene (1820 – 22 August 1894) was Surveyor General of Victoria, (then a colony, now a state of Australia) from 1869 to 1886.

Early life
Skene was born Aberdeen, Scotland, the son of Alexander John Skene, an army major, and his wife Catherine Margaret, née Auldjowas. Skene junior was educated at the University of Aberdeen and practised in surveying.

Career in Australia
Skene arrived in Melbourne in 1839, became official surveyor to the Grant district council in 1843 and a government district surveyor in October 1848. Skene showed the theodolite to be a more accurate and reliable than the compass technique previously used. 
In 1853 Skene was placed in charge of the District Survey Office at Geelong and in 1854 was appointed Surveyor of the colony under patent. Three years afterwards Mr. Skene was specially employed to report on the nature and capability of the land of the colony, and in 1862 was transferred to Melbourne. He was appointed Acting Surveyor-General in 1868. In September 1869, Skene replaced Charles Whybrow Ligar as Surveyor-General of Victoria. Skene was a key figure in producing an accurate map of Victoria on a scale of eight miles to the inch (about 5 km per cm) in 1876.

Late life
Skene retired in 1886 (his replacement as Surveyor-General was Alexander Black). Made a commissioner of land tax in 1878, Skene was reappointed in 1887.  Skene died in St Kilda, Melbourne, Victoria, Australia on 22 August 1894, survived by three of his four sons and one of his two daughters. Skene, who was married at Heidelberg, Victoria, on 31 August 1842, to Miss Catherine Williamson, was appointed a J.P. in 1865.

References 

1820 births
1894 deaths
Surveyors General of Victoria
Australian surveyors
19th-century Australian public servants
Scottish emigrants to colonial Australia